The following index is provided as an overview of and topical guide to the protected areas of South Africa:

A protected area of South Africa is an area of land, coastline or ocean within the exclusive economic zone (EEZ) of the Republic of South Africa that is protected in terms of specific legislation.

A

B

C

D

F

G

H

I

J

K

L

M

N

O

P

R

S

T

U

W
 
 
 

World heritage sites
Fossil Hominid Sites of Sterkfontein, Swartkrans, Kromdraai, and Environs
Cape Floristic Region Protected Areas
iSimangaliso Wetland Park
Mapungubwe Cultural Landscape
Richtersveld Cultural and Botanical Landscape
Robben Island
uKhahlamba/Drakensberg Park
Vredefort Dome

References

Protected areas of South Africa
Biosphere reserves of South Africa
Ecoregions of South Africa
Flora of South Africa
Protected areas of South Africa